The 1920 Tour of Flanders was the fourth edition of the Tour of Flanders road cycling one-day race and was held on 21 March 1920. The race was won by Jules Vanhevel.

General classification

References

External links
 Résultats complets
 Classement les-sports.info

Tour of Flanders
1920 in road cycling
1920 in Belgian sport
March 1920 sports events